Macrostomus apicalis is a species of dance flies, in the fly family Empididae.

References

Macrostomus
Taxa named by Mario Bezzi
Insects described in 1909
Diptera of South America